Elachocharax is a genus of small fish in the family Crenuchidae (South American darters). They are native to the Amazon and Orinoco basins in South America.

Species
There are currently four recognized species in this genus:
 Elachocharax geryi S. H. Weitzman & Kanazawa, 1978
 Elachocharax junki (Géry, 1971)
 Elachocharax mitopterus S. H. Weitzman, 1986
 Elachocharax pulcher G. S. Myers, 1927

References

Characiformes genera
Taxa named by George S. Myers
Fish of South America
Crenuchidae